Line Johansen   (born 12 January 1970)  is a Norwegian sport wrestler and twice world champion.

Career
Johansen won a silver medal at the 1987 World Wrestling Championships, and bronze medals in 1990, 1991 and 1992. She won a gold medal at the 1993 World Wrestling Championships, and again a gold medal in 1994.

She won a total of seven national championships.

References

1970 births
Living people
Norwegian female sport wrestlers
World Wrestling Championships medalists
World Wrestling Champions
20th-century Norwegian women
21st-century Norwegian women